NASA Astronaut Group 18 (The Bugs). The group saw the training of seven pilots and ten mission specialists to become NASA astronauts. These 17 astronauts began training in August 2000.

Pilots
 Dominic A. Antonelli (2 flights)
 Pilot, STS-119 (Discovery)
 Pilot, STS-132 (Atlantis)
 Eric A. Boe (2 flights)
 Pilot, STS-126 (Endeavour)
 Pilot, STS-133 (Discovery)
 Kevin A. Ford (2 flights)
 Pilot, STS-128 (Discovery)
Soyuz TMA-06M
 Flight engineer, Expedition 33
 ISS commander, Expedition 34
 Ronald J. Garan, Jr. (2 flights)
 Mission specialist, STS-124 (Discovery)
Soyuz TMA-21
 Flight engineer, Expedition 27
 Flight engineer, Expedition 28
 Douglas G. Hurley (3 flights)
 Pilot, STS-127 (Endeavour)
 Pilot, STS-135 (Atlantis)
 Commander, SpaceX Demo-2 (Endeavour)
 Flight engineer, Expedition 63
 Terry W. Virts, Jr. (2 flights)
 Pilot, STS-130 (Endeavour)
 Soyuz TMA-15M
 Flight engineer, Expedition 42
 ISS commander, Expedition 43
 Barry E. Wilmore (2 flights)
 Pilot, STS-129 (Atlantis)
 Soyuz TMA-14M
 Flight engineer, Expedition 41
 ISS commander, Expedition 42
 ISS commander, Expedition 43
 Future flight Commander, Boeing CFT (Calypso)

Mission specialists
 Michael R. Barratt (2 flights)
 Soyuz TMA-14
 Flight engineer, Expedition 19
 Flight engineer, Expedition 20
 Mission specialist, STS-133 (Discovery)
 Robert L. Behnken (3 flights)
 Mission specialist, STS-123 (Endeavour)
 Mission specialist, STS-130 (Endeavour)
 Joint operations commander, SpaceX Demo-2 (Endeavour)
 Flight engineer, Expedition 63
 Stephen G. Bowen (3 flights)
 Mission specialist, STS-126 (Endeavour)
 Mission specialist, STS-132 (Atlantis)
 Mission specialist, STS-133 (Discovery)
 B. Alvin Drew (2 flights)
 Mission specialist, STS-118 (Endeavour)
 Mission specialist, STS-133 (Discovery)
 Andrew J. Feustel (3 flights)
 NEEMO 9
 Mission specialist, STS-125 (Atlantis)
 Mission specialist, STS-134 (Endeavour)
 Soyuz MS-08
 Flight engineer, Expedition 55
 ISS commander, Expedition 56
 Michael T. Good (2 flights)
 Mission specialist, STS-125 (Atlantis)
 Mission specialist, STS-132 (Atlantis)
 Timothy L. Kopra (2 flights)
 NEEMO 11
 Mission specialist, STS-127 (Endeavour)
 Flight engineer, Expedition 20
 Mission specialist, STS-128 (Discovery)
 Flight engineer, Expedition 46
 ISS commander, Expedition 47
 K. Megan McArthur (2 flights)
 Mission specialist, STS-125 (Atlantis)
 Pilot, SpaceX Crew-2
 Flight engineer, Expedition 65
 Karen L. Nyberg (2 flights)
 NEEMO 10
 Mission specialist, STS-124 (Discovery)
 Soyuz TMA-09M
 Flight engineer, Expedition 36
 Flight engineer, Expedition 37
 Nicole P. Stott (2 flights)
 NEEMO 9
 Mission specialist, STS-128 (Discovery)
 Flight engineer, Expedition 20
 Flight engineer, Expedition 21
 Mission specialist, STS-129 (Atlantis)
 Mission specialist, STS-133 (Discovery)

See also
List of astronauts by selection

External links
NASA Active Astronauts Biographies

NASA Astronaut Corps
Lists of astronauts